The premier of Prince Edward Island is the first minister and head of government for the Canadian province of Prince Edward Island.

The current premier of Prince Edward Island is Dennis King, from the Progressive Conservative Party.

See also 

 Prime Minister of Canada
 Premier (Canada)
 List of premiers of Prince Edward Island

References

External links